Acanthotrophon sentus is a species of sea snail, a marine gastropod mollusc in the family Muricidae in the genus Acanthotrophon, the murex snails or rock snails.

Description
The base color of the shell is bright white and its sculpture is coarse with numerous stout spines which are paired in two rows at the periphery.  The tips of the spines in some specimens are brown in color.  Compare with Acanthotrophon carduus which has more numerous spines and is dull white in color.  Length 20 mm, diameter 15 mm.

Distribution
Found subtidally in deep water from Academy Bay, Santa Cruz Island, California to Galápagos Islands.

References

External links
 To Encyclopedia of Life
 To World Register of Marine Species

Muricopsinae
Gastropods described in 1969